Sauk–Prairie Airport  is a privately owned public use airport located 2 miles (3 km) west of the central business district of Prairie du Sac and 3 miles (5 km) northwest of the central business district of Sauk City, two adjacent villages in Sauk County, Wisconsin, United States. Sauk Prairie, Wisconsin is the nickname for the two combined communities. The airport is included in the Federal Aviation Administration (FAA) National Plan of Integrated Airport Systems for 2021–2025, in which it is categorized as a general aviation facility.

Although most airports in the United States use the same three-letter location identifier for the FAA and International Air Transport Association (IATA), this airport is assigned 91C by the FAA but has no designation from the IATA.

Facilities and aircraft 
Sauk–Prairie Airport covers an area of 20 acres (8 ha) at an elevation of 832 feet (254 m) above mean sea level. It has one runway: 18/36 is 2,936 by 60 feet (895 x 18 m) with an asphalt surface, it has approved GPS approaches.

For the 12-month period ending July 16, 2020, the airport had 8,350 aircraft operations, an average of 23 per day: 96% general aviation, 4% military and less than 1% air taxi.
In January 2023, there were 31 aircraft based at this airport: 29 single-engine, 1 jet and 1 glider.

See also
List of airports in Wisconsin

References

External links 
 
 

Airports in Wisconsin
Airports in Sauk County, Wisconsin